Brachycephalus verrucosus is a species of frogs in the family Brachycephalidae. It is very tiny and was one of seven new species described by LF Ribeiro and a team of scientists from the Mater Natura - Instituto de Estudos Ambientais in Brazil. Like all species in its genus, it is found in a very small strip of Atlantic Forest in the southeastern coast of the country, and has a vibrant colour pattern. The speciation seen in this genus is thought to be a byproduct of the rift between the valley versus mountain terrain and its particular microclimates, to which they are adapted. It might be in population decline due to habitat loss. Its name is derived from the Latin verrucosus, "warty" or "rugged", alluding to the frogs highly rugose dorsum.

Description
The skin on its dorsum shows no dermal co-ossification. Being a representative of the pernix group, it is most similar to B. olivaceus due to their green coloration, yet the orange coloration of this species' belly differs from the yellow and green coloration found in the belly of B. olivaceus. The species dorsal coloration is a lighter colour overall due to the alternation of small yellow and green spots throughout.

Distribution

References

Further reading

External links
Photos from the 7 new species

Brachycephalus
Endemic fauna of Brazil
Amphibians of Brazil
Frogs of South America
Amphibians described in 2015